Flen Municipality (Flens kommun) is a municipality in central Södermanland County in southeast Sweden. Its seat is located in the city of Flen.

The present municipality was formed in 1971 through the amalgamation of the City of Flen (instituted in 1949), the market town (köping) Malmköping and the surrounding countryside, including a southeastern portion of the former Oppunda hundred that was split between Flen and Nyköping municipalities. It also includes all of the former Villåttinge hundred.

Geography

Localities  
Figures from Statistics Sweden, 2004.

Flen 6,107
Malmköping 2,006
Hälleforsnäs 1,737
Sparreholm 799
Skebokvarn 225
Mellösa 549
Bettna 410
Vadsbro 118

Of these places, Malmköping, located about 15 km north of Flen, surpasses Flen as a tourism attraction due to its two annual markets. The traditions of markets in Malmköping goes back centuries, as Malmköping got market town rights (became a köping) already in 1785.

Elections
The following results are since the 1972 municipal reform onwards.

Riksdag

Demographics
This is a demographic table based on Flen Municipality's electoral districts in the 2022 Swedish general election sourced from SVT's election platform, in turn taken from SCB official statistics.

Residents include everyone registered as living in the district, regardless of age or citizenship status. Valid voters indicate Swedish citizens above the age of 18 who therefore can vote in general elections. Left vote and right vote indicate the result between the two major blocs in said district in the 2022 general election. Employment indicates the share of people between the ages of 20 and 64 who are working taxpayers. Foreign background denotes residents either born abroad or with two parents born outside of Sweden. Median income is the received monthly income through either employment, capital gains or social grants for the median adult above 20, also including pensioners in Swedish kronor. College graduates indicates any degree accumulated after high school.

Flen is a poor municipality by lower Svealand standards. As of 2022 it was a rather segregated municipality with very high levels of ethnic minority populations concentrated south of the railway, while people of Swedish background are in a sizeable majority in the outer parts of town and in the countryside. Every district was beneath the median income of its southern neighbour Nyköping. In total there were 16,271 inhabitants with 11,959 Swedish citizen adults eligible to vote. The political demographics were 50.4% for the left bloc and 48.4% for the right bloc, with the left dominating the town and the right sizeably winning the villages and countryside. No district reached 35% college graduates and unemployment was high throughout much of the municipality.

References

External links

Flen Municipality - Official site

Municipalities of Södermanland County